Nabulsi (or naboulsi) is one of a number of Palestinian white brined cheeses made in the Middle East. Its name refers to its place of origin, Nablus, and it is well known throughout the West Bank and surrounding regions. Nabulsi, along with Akkawi cheese, is one of the principal cheeses consumed in Jordan. It is produced primarily from sheep's milk; alternatively, goat's milk may be used. Nabulsi cheese is white and rectangular in shape. It is semi-hard with no gas holes. It becomes soft and elastic when heated. It is a typical ewe's or goat's milk cheese, but is traditionally flavored with mahleb (Prunus mahaleb) and mastic (Pistacia lentiscus) added to the boiling brine. It can be eaten fresh as salty table cheese or can be fried in oil, and it is also a major ingredient of the Middle Eastern dessert knafeh.

See also

References

Works cited

 
 

Arab cuisine
Levantine cuisine
Palestinian cuisine
Jordanian cuisine
Syrian cuisine
Cow's-milk cheeses
Goat's-milk cheeses
Sheep's-milk cheeses
Nablus
Brined cheeses
Palestinian inventions